John Skinner (31 October 1721 – 16 June 1807) was a Scottish historian and songwriter.

Born in Balfour, Aberdeenshire, he was a son of a schoolmaster at Birse, and was educated at Marischal College.

Brought up as a Presbyterian, he became an Episcopalian and ministered to a congregation at Longside, near Peterhead, for 65 years. He wrote The Ecclesiastical History of Scotland from the Episcopal point of view, and several songs of which The Reel of Tullochgorum and The Ewie wi' the Crookit Horn are the best known, and he also rendered some of the Psalms into Latin. He kept up a rhyming correspondence with Robert Burns.

He died at the home of his son, John Skinner, Bishop Coadjutor of Aberdeen on 16 June 1807.

Sources
Author and Bookinfo.com

See also

Scottish literature

1721 births
1807 deaths
Alumni of the University of Aberdeen
Anglican saints
Scottish poets
18th-century Scottish historians
People from Aberdeenshire
Scottish Episcopalian clergy
Scottish songwriters
19th-century Christian saints